Article I, Section 3, Clause 4 of the United States Constitution provides that the vice president of the United States is the ex officio president of the Senate, and that the vice president may cast a vote in the Senate only in order to break a tie. According to information provided by the Office of the Secretary of the Senate, as of March 1, 2023, the collective number of tie-breaking votes cast by vice presidents was 297.

Constitutional basis

Article I, Section 3, Clause 4 of the Constitution of the United States directly states:

History

The first vice president of the United States, John Adams, cast 29 tie-breaking votes. He cast his first tie-breaking vote on July 18, 1789. His votes protected the president's sole authority over the removal of appointees, influenced the location of the national capital, and prevented war with Great Britain. On at least one occasion he persuaded senators to vote against legislation that he opposed, and he frequently lectured the Senate on procedural and policy matters. Adams' political views and his active role in the Senate made him a natural target for critics of the Washington administration. Toward the end of his first term, as a result of a threatened resolution that would have silenced him except for procedural and policy matters, he began to exercise more restraint in the hope of realizing the goal shared by many of his successors: election in his own right as President of the United States.

John C. Calhoun was the only vice president to ever cast tie-breaking votes against his own president, Andrew Jackson. President Jackson nominated Martin Van Buren as United States Minister to the United Kingdom, as Van Buren was acting minister on a recess appointment. Calhoun cast a tie-breaking vote to delay the nomination on January 13, 1832, and later cast a vote to defeat the nomination on January 25. Calhoun's supporters in the Senate provided him with the opportunity to spite Jackson, where just enough of Calhoun's faction abstained to create a tie that he was then able to break.

In the early 21st century, the increased threat of a filibuster led to a rise in the use of cloture to end debate in the Senate, especially on high-profile issues where the Senate is sharply divided. The increased use of cloture made the vice president's tie-breaking vote less likely to be used, as the invocation of cloture requires a three-fifths majority (rather than a simple majority). However, in 2013, the cloture requirement was reduced to a simple majority for all executive and judicial nominations except Supreme Court nominations. In 2017, the cloture requirement was reduced to a simple majority for Supreme Court nominations. These rules changes led to the first ever use of a tie-breaking vote to confirm a Cabinet member when Mike Pence broke a tie to confirm Betsy DeVos as Secretary of Education in 2017. In 2018, Pence broke a tie to confirm Jonathan A. Kobes to the Court of Appeals for the Eighth Circuit; this was the first ever tie-breaking vote to confirm a judicial nominee in U.S. history.

As a result of the 2020 Senate elections, the 117th Congress's Senate was divided 50–50 between Republicans and Democrats; therefore, Vice President Kamala Harris's tie-breaking vote was instrumental in passing Democratic legislation as it gave the party a majority in the Senate. On July 20, 2021, Harris broke Pence's record for the number of tie-breaking votes in the first year of a vice presidency when she cast the seventh tie-breaking vote in her first six months. Harris cast 15 tie-breaking votes during her first year in office, the most tie-breaking votes in a single year in U.S. history, surpassing John Adams who cast 12 votes in 1790. On May 11, 2022, Harris cast four tie-breaking votes, setting the all-time record of tie-breaking votes in a single day.

List of vice presidents by number of tie-breaking votes
, there have been 297 tie-breaking votes cast by vice presidents.

List of tie-breaking votes since 1945

References

External links
U.S. Senate: Tie Votes (Secretary of the U.S. Senate)

tie-breaking votes cast
τ
Lists related to the United States Senate
Articles containing video clips